Seyed Mohammad Alavi (born 29 January 1982 in Kashan, Iran) is an Iranian retired footballer and football manager. He manages Esteghlal Khuzestan in Persian Gulf Pro League. He usually played in the defensive midfield position.

Club career 
A product of the football rich province of Khuzestan and the young team of Foolad, he was a pivotal player within this young team and his consistency and solid defending was one of the factors for the success of his club in becoming the champions of the IPL 2004/05. He played for the club in Iran's Premier League till its relegation to the lower division, Azadegan League, in 2007. He also played for Foolad in the 2006 AFC Champions League group stage.

He moved to Pas and stayed there for a season. He moved to Persepolis and stayed for few months where he only played 2 games and had no spot in the team because of excellent performances by Karim Bagheri and Maziar Zare and moved for back to Pas for 6 months loan. He moved back to Foolad in summer 2009.

Club Career Statistics
Last Update  4 May 2011 

 Assist Goals

International career

Under-23 national team 
Alavi stormed on the national scene after his header goal against China in Azadi Stadium which assured Iran Under-23 team 3 points in the anticipated revival of the team's chances in the 2004 Olympic qualifying matches. Although Alavi was selected by then coach Mohammad Mayeli Kohan in the roster of the U23 team, he was not given much playing time. After Hossein Faraki was appointed as the new coach, Alavi was given more playing time in all the remaining matches. Apart from his goal against China, Alavi played well in all the remaining matches under Faraki although it was a step too late as Iran did not manage to dislodge the Koreans from clinching the qualification to Athens.

Senior national team 
In the 2004 Asian Cup, Alavi scored a goal in Iran's controversial loss to China in the semifinals of the tournament held in China 2004. The goal kept Iran's hopes alive, as they were forced to play one man down due to a red card, but China progressed to the final match at the end by penalty shoot-outs.

Alavi was usually a substitute player within the national team and was not part of the World Cup squad.

Honours
Persian Gulf Cup
 2003–04 with Foolad

References

External Links

1982 births
Foolad FC players
Persepolis F.C. players
2004 AFC Asian Cup players
Association football midfielders
Iran international footballers
Iranian footballers
Living people
Pas players
People from Kashan
Machine Sazi F.C. players
Gostaresh Foulad F.C. players